The David McEwen House is a property in Franklin, Tennessee, United States that was listed on the National Register of Historic Places in 1988. It includes Dogtrot log cabin architecture.

This house is one of five log buildings built during 1798 to 1800 (the earliest non-indigenous settling of the area) which survive to the present.  Others, also NRHP-listed, are: the William Ogilvie House, the Andrew Crockett House, the Daniel McMahan House, and the William Boyd House.

See also
Christopher McEwen House, also NRHP-listed in Franklin, Tennessee

References

Houses on the National Register of Historic Places in Tennessee
National Register of Historic Places in Williamson County, Tennessee
Houses in Franklin, Tennessee
Dogtrot architecture in Tennessee
Houses completed in 1798